Cyperus strigosus is a species of sedge known by the common names false nutsedge and straw-colored flatsedge. It is native to the United States, Cuba and Canada, where it grows in wet areas in many habitat types, including disturbed and cultivated areas such as roadsides and crop fields. It is common and sometimes weedy. It is a perennial sedge growing up to 70 centimetres tall. The inflorescence is a cluster of many linear-shaped spikelets up to 3 centimetres long each. A few long, leaf-like bracts grow at the base of the spike.

Introduced populations occur in Bulgaria, France, Italy, Spain and Bangladesh.

See also
 List of Cyperus species

References

External links
USDA Plants Profile
Photo gallery

strigosus
Flora of North America
Plants described in 1753
Taxa named by Carl Linnaeus